Dmitri Kazarlyga (born July 12, 1971) is a former ice dancer who competed internationally for Kazakhstan. With partner Elizaveta Stekolnikova, he is the 1994 Skate America bronze medalist, 1995 Winter Universiade bronze medalist, and 1996 Asian Winter Games champion. They placed 18th at the 1994 Winter Olympics and 22nd at the 1998 Winter Olympics.

Early in his career, Kazarlyga skated with Kuralai Tilebaldinova (Uzurova) in Almaty. He teamed up with Stekolnikova after moving to Moscow and trained with her in the United States under Natalia Dubova. Their partnership ended in 1998.

Kazarlyga has worked as a coach in Massachusetts. He coached Jessica Huot / Juha Valkama.

Results
GP: Champions Series (Grand Prix)

 with Stekolnikova

References

 Skatabase: 1990s Olympics Ice Dancing Results

External links
 

Kazakhstani male ice dancers
Living people
Figure skaters at the 1998 Winter Olympics
Figure skaters at the 1994 Winter Olympics
Olympic figure skaters of Kazakhstan
Figure skating coaches
Asian Games medalists in figure skating
Figure skaters at the 1996 Asian Winter Games
Kazakhstani emigrants to the United States
1971 births

Medalists at the 1996 Asian Winter Games
Asian Games gold medalists for Kazakhstan
Universiade medalists in figure skating
Universiade bronze medalists for Kazakhstan
Competitors at the 1995 Winter Universiade